Badda is a village in Dhaka Division of eastern Bangladesh.

References

Populated places in Chandpur District